Domoszló is a village in Heves County, Northern Hungary Region, Hungary.

Etymology
The name comes from a Slavic personal name, compare with Czech Domaslav, Domislav or Polish Domisław.

Sights to visit
 Catholic church
 Castle ruin of Oroszlánkő

References

Populated places in Heves County